Andrea Pizzitola (born 19 June 1992) is a professional French racing driver. He is best known for finishing as the runner-up in the 2011 French F4 Championship season.

Career

Karting
Born in Montpellier, Pizzitola entered karting in 2008, racing in local championships. His best achievement was eighth place in the French KF2 Championship in 2011.

Formula Renault
In 2011, Pizzitola made his début in single-seaters, taking part in the French F4 Championship 1.6-litre category. He finished as runner-up to his future Eurocup rival Matthieu Vaxivière with seven podiums, including wins at Lédenon, Val de Vienne and Albi.

Pizzitola moved to the 2-litre Formula Renault machinery in 2012, joining R-Ace GP in the Formula Renault Eurocup. He finished 21st with two-point-scoring finishes. He also had eleven starts in the Formula Renault 2.0 Northern European Cup with the same team, collecting podiums at Hockenheim, the Nürburgring and Assen.

Pizzitola stayed with R-Ace GP — rebranded as the ART Junior Team for 2013. He took his first Eurocup podium in the series finale at Barcelona, as well as another four-point-scoring positions. He also continued competing in Formula Renault 2.0 NEC, winning his first Formula Renault race at Hockenheim, improving to sixth in the standings.

For the 2014 season, Pizzitola switched to Manor MP Motorsport. It helped him to secure his first Eurocup win at Alcañiz. He had another win at the Hungaroring, finally finishing the season in fourth place in the championship. As in previous years, he combined his Eurocup participations with the NEC series, winning a race at the Nürburgring.

Racing record

Career summary

Complete European Le Mans Series results

‡ Half points awarded as less than 75% of race distance was completed.

24 Hours of Le Mans results

References

External links
 

1992 births
Living people
Sportspeople from Montpellier
24 Hours of Le Mans drivers
French racing drivers
French F4 Championship drivers
Formula Renault 2.0 NEC drivers
Formula Renault Eurocup drivers
Manor Motorsport drivers
MP Motorsport drivers
R-ace GP drivers
ART Grand Prix drivers
Auto Sport Academy drivers
G-Drive Racing drivers
TDS Racing drivers